Sakharnaya Golova (Ostrov Sakharnaya Golova, meaning "Sugarloaf Island") is a small island in the northwestern Sea of Okhotsk. 
It is part of the Shantar Islands National Park.

Geography
Sakharnaya Golova is one of the Shantar Islands. It has an elevation of 171 m and lies to the west of Feklistova Island.

History

The island was frequented by American whaleships hunting bowhead whales between 1857 and 1889.

References

Shantar Islands